The 1980 NCAA Division III men's basketball tournament was the sixth annual single-elimination tournament, held during March 1980, to determine the national champions of National Collegiate Athletic Association (NCAA) men's Division III collegiate basketball in the United States.

The tournament field included 32 teams with the national championship rounds contested at Augustana College in Rock Island, Illinois.

Two-time defending champions North Park defeated Upsala, 83–76, in the championship game to claim their third overall title.

Regional Rounds

Regional No. 1

Regional No. 2

Regional No. 3

Regional No. 4

Regional No. 5

Regional No. 6

Regional No. 7

Regional No. 8

Championship Rounds
Site: Rock Island, Illinois

See also
1980 NCAA Division I basketball tournament
1980 NCAA Division II basketball tournament
1980 NAIA Basketball Tournament

References

NCAA Division III men's basketball tournament
NCAA Men's Division III Basketball
Ncaa Tournament
NCAA Division III basketball tournament